Cadete FAP Guillermo del Castillo Paredes Airport  is an airport serving Tarapoto, Peru. It is owned by CORPAC S.A, a government organization that oversees the management of Peruvian airports, but it is run by Aeropuertos del Perú (ADP) S.A, as a concession. It is the main airport of the San Martín Region, located in the Amazon, and is used by many tourists as a jumping-off point for trips into the jungle.

Airlines and destinations

See also
Transport in Peru
List of airports in Peru

References

External links 
 Aeropuertos del Perú, Página Oficial
OurAirports - Tarapota
SkyVector Aeronautical Charts

Airports in Peru
Tarapoto
Buildings and structures in San Martín Region